Calder Highway is a rural highway in Australia, linking Mildura and the Victoria/New South Wales border to Bendigo, in North Central Victoria. South of Bendigo, where the former highway has been upgraded to freeway-standard, Calder Freeway links to Melbourne, subsuming former alignments of Calder Highway; the Victorian Government completed the conversion to freeway standard from Melbourne to Bendigo on 20 April 2009.

Route
South of the Victoria/New South Wales border the highway is a dual-lane, single-carriageway road, continuing through northwest Victoria from the Abbotsford Bridge, through Merbein to the major regional town of Mildura, where it is 2 lanes each way through southern Mildura and Irymple, in the state's north-west. Here also it crosses the Sturt Highway (A20) leading to capital cities Adelaide heading west and Sydney heading east. Further south, it crosses the Mallee Highway (B12) at Ouyen and runs south-east eventually to Bendigo. Between Red Cliffs and Wycheproof the highway has a speed limit of 110 km/h.

The Calder Alternate Highway (A790) connects to the Calder Highway at either end - just north of Ravenswood, and at Marong - and provides a bypass west of Bendigo.

For most of its length from Ravenswood to the junction with the Tullamarine Freeway in Melbourne, the Calder Freeway is a four-lane dual-carriageway freeway which bypasses the towns along the former alignment of the highway. 

The northern end of the freeway shares a concurrency with the Midland Highway (A300), from Bendigo until south of Harcourt, where it resumes south-westerly to the major regional centres of Castlemaine, Ballarat, and Geelong.

The freeway ends at the interchange with the Tullamarine Freeway, the main route to Melbourne's central business district to Melbourne Airport.

Within the urban section of the Calder Freeway (between Kings Road and the Tullamarine Freeway), the standard travel time, in each direction, is 10 minutes. (5 minutes between Kings Road and the Western Ring Road and 5 minutes between the Western Ring Road and the Tullamarine Freeway.

The usual peak period travel time, is between 9–13 minutes. However, when there is extreme congestion or roadworks, including being residual from an incident, the travel time can go beyond 13 minutes, sometimes upwards of 20 minutes plus.

History
The passing of the Highways and Vehicles Act of 1924 through the Parliament of Victoria provided for the declaration of State Highways, roads two-thirds financed by the State government through the Country Roads Board (later VicRoads). The North-Western Highway was declared a State Highway on 1 July 1925, cobbled from a collection of roads from Melbourne through Kyneton, Castlemaine, Bendigo, Sea Lake and Ouyen to Mildura (for a total of 324 miles); before this declaration, the road between Melbourne and Bendigo was referred to as (Main) Bendigo Road or Melbourne-Bendigo Road. 

The North-Western Highway was renamed the Calder Highway in 1928, after William Calder, chairman of the Country Roads Board from 1913-28. In the 1959/60 financial year, another section from Elphinstone to Harcourt was added as a deviation bypassing Castlemaine, along the former Elphinstone-Harcourt Road (already having been declared a Main Road by the Country Roads Board in 1937/38 financial year); the previous alignments of the Calder Highway from Elphinstone to Castlemaine, and Castlemaine to Harcourt, were subsumed into the Pyrenees Highway and Midland Highway respectively. The Calder Alternative Highway was declared in June 1983, along the former Ravenswood-Marong Road.

The Calder Highway was later signed National Route 79 in 1955; when the Midland Highway was allocated State Route 149 in 1986, it shared a concurrency along the Calder Highway between Harcourt and Bendigo. With Victoria's conversion to the newer alphanumeric system in the late 1990s this was altered to an A79 designation for the highway portion, and a M79 designation for the freeway portion into Melbourne (and the concurrency with Midland Highway was replaced with route A300); the New South Wales section was left unallocated when they switched to the alphanumeric system in 2013. Calder Alternative Highway was signed Alternative National Route 79 between Ravenswood and Marong, and was later replaced by route A790.

Originally, the Calder Highway ran through northwestern Melbourne as an undivided highway, ultimately through Niddrie as Keilor Road and terminating in Essendon; traffic continued south along Mount Alexander Road to reach central Melbourne. Keilor Road - already heavily congested and supporting a tram line - was eventually bypassed by a freeway-standard road in 1972 to terminate at a junction with Lancefield Road (later upgraded to the Tullamarine Freeway), rejoining the Calder Highway at the western end of Niddrie; the freeway-standard was extended further west to East Keilor (the future location of the Western Ring Road interchange) in 1975, and to Keilor by the early 1980s. However, it was not until the 1990s that work began to duplicate the rest of the highway to Bendigo.

The Howard Government broadened the criteria under which roads qualify for Commonwealth road funding by introducing Roads of National Importance program in the 1996-97 financial year where such declarations were based on the recognition that roads outside the National Highway system also provide social benefits, and were funded jointly with the States and Territories usually on a 50:50 basis. As a major road link between Melbourne, Bendigo, and the state's northwest, supporting the region's primary manufacturing and tourism industries, the Calder Highway was declared a Road of National Importance between Melbourne and Bendigo in December 1996.

The passing of the Road Management Act 2004 granted the responsibility of overall management and development of Victoria's major arterial roads to VicRoads: in 2004, VicRoads re-declared the road as Calder Alternative Highway (Arterial #6200) between Ravenswood and Marong, and in 2011 as Calder Highway (Arterial #6530) between the border with New South Wales at Yelta and the interchange with Calder Alternate Highway and Ravenswood Street in Ravenswood, and as Calder Freeway (Freeway #1530) between Ravenswood and Tullamarine Freeway, Airport West.

Timeline of construction

1972 – Calder Freeway, initial  section of freeway with 3 lanes in each direction, from the Tullamarine Freeway/Lancefield Road intersection to Calder Highway at Niddrie, opened by Minister for Local Government, the Hon. A J Hunt MLC, 21 April 1972, at a cost of $3 million.
1975 – Extended 2 km from The Avenue in Niddrie to Erebus Street in Keilor East, opened December 1974 at a cost of $2.5 million.
1982 – Extended 3.8 km from Erebus Street to Arundel Road, Keilor, with two lanes each direction plus emergency stopping lanes, opened by Minister for Transport, the Hon S M Crabb MP, 18 May 1982, at a cost of $15.5 million.
1984 – Keilor bypass, Bendigo-bound carriageway from Arundel Road to west of Oakbank Road, opened by Assistant Minister of Transport, the Hon Jack Simpson MP, 17 April 1984; the opening of this carriageway completed the bypass of Keilor. The cost of the entire bypass from Erebus Street to west of Oakbank Road was $30 million.
1989 – Gisborne bypass opened 17 March 1989. The 6 km bypass cost A$25m.
1990/1991 – Oakbank Road, Keilor North to Duncans Lane, Diggers Rest. 7.7 km of newly duplicated '2 lane carriageway' opened to traffic at a cost of A$14m. No exact date was given, however VicRoads Annual Reports cover the previous financial year.
1991/1992 – 2 km of duplication completed at Ravenswood during 1991/1992 at a cost of A$1.3m.
1993 – Diggers Rest bypass. $A32m 6.5 km bypass opened to traffic in July 1993, followed by the Vinyard Road interchange in November 1993.
1994 – Ravenswood section. Duplication of the highway completed 'in 1994'
1995 – Kyneton bypass opened to traffic in April 1995, at a cost of A$31m.
1996 – Gap Hill section (Diggers Rest to Millett Road). Opened in May 1996, at a cost of A$32m.
1998 – Gisborne South to Gisborne. 6 km completed at a cost of A$31 and opened to traffic on 3 April 1998.
2000 – Gisborne to Woodend (Black Forest section). 6.8 km section opened to traffic on 17 March 2000. Completed at a cost of A$51m.
2001 – Woodend bypass. 13.5 km bypass opened to traffic on 19 December 2001. The total cost of the project was A$85m.
2003 – Carlsruhe section. 6.5 km section opened to traffic on 16 April 2003, at a cost of A$46m. This section completed the dual carriageways from Keilor to Kyneton.
2005 – 2.5 km north of Kyneton completed in January 2005.
2005 – Ravenswood. 6.5 km duplication south of Ravenswood completed in May 2005
2008 – 15 km Malmsbury section opened in April 2008.
2009 – Harcourt North to Elphinstone opened on 20 April 2009. This 19 km section cost A$404m and completed the duplication of the highway between Melbourne and Bendigo. The project was jointly funded by the state and federal governments.
2012 – Kings Road interchange, opened in January 2012, at a cost of $62 million, jointly funded by state and federal governments.
2018 – Ravenswood (Calder Highway, Calder Freeway and Calder Alternative Highway) interchange, reconstruction started May 2016 and completed in March 2018, at a cost of $86 million, jointly funded by state and federal governments.

1969 Melbourne Transportation Plan
The Calder Highway between the Melton Highway and the Western Ring Road is shown in the 1969 Melbourne Transportation Plan as part of the F4 Freeway corridor, which extends past the Tullamarine Freeway and Bell Street to Templestowe.

Upgrades

Western Ring Road to Kings Road
In 2008, VicRoads completed the widening of the Calder Freeway from the Western Ring Road to Melton Highway. The road was widened from 2 lanes each direction to 3 lanes in each direction. The speed limit was reduced permanently from 100 km/h to 80 km/h. The 80 km/hr limit applies northbound from Keilor Park Drive to the Service Centre at Calder Park, and southbound it applies from the Green Gully Road bridge to just prior to the Western Ring Road interchange. In October 2010, it was announced that as part of a year long trial, the speed limit on this section of freeway will be increased back to 100 km/h in off-peak times (8pm-5am), with 30 variable speed limits to be installed along the stretch of freeway. As of 2011, the section between Keilor Park Drive and Kings Road is permanently signed at 80 km/h – with slight differences (as noted) inbound and outbound. A further upgrade completed in 2012 resulted in a new interchange at Kings Road (the freeways's urban / metropolitan limits) and closure of three at grade intersections in the area. Despite the upgrade the 80 km/h speed limit remains today.

Gallery

Major Intersections and Towns

See also 

 Highways in Australia
 Highways in Victoria
 Freeways in Australia
 Freeways in Victoria
 Road transport in Victoria

External links 
Timelapse footage of the Calder Freeway between Bendigo and Melbourne

References 

Highways in Victoria (Australia)
Highways and freeways in Melbourne
Transport in the City of Moonee Valley
Transport in the City of Brimbank
Transport in the City of Hume
Transport in the City of Melton
Transport in Bendigo
Rural City of Mildura
Shire of Buloke
Shire of Loddon
Mount Alexander Shire
Shire of Macedon Ranges